Avory is an English surname. Notable people with the surname include:

 Henry Avory (1848–1918), English cricket player
 Horace Avory (1851–1935), English High Court judge
 Mick Avory (born 1944), English musician

See also
 Avery (disambiguation)

English-language surnames